Ballencrieff is a settlement in West Lothian, Scotland, situated equidistant between the towns of Bathgate and Torphichen and seven miles south of Linlithgow. Neighbouring towns are Armadale, Blackburn, Livingston, Stoneyburn and Whitburn. Edinburgh Airport is 16 miles (25 km) away, to the East. Ballencrieff is very close to the Neolithic burial site at Cairnpapple Hill, and the surrounding area shows signs of habitation since about 3500 BC. The name Ballencrieff comes from the Scottish Gaelic Baile na Craoibhe meaning "Farm by the tree".

History

Medieval Ballencrieff (1300–1600) 
In 1599, on the 25th of January, Alexander Hamilton became the first Baron of Ballencrieff (and his wife Christine the Baroness), by Crown Charter from King James VI.

Modern Ballencrieff (21st century) 
The area is dominated by agriculture and is home to farms and fisheries, such as Ballencrieff Farm. The Ballencrieff Fishery is well known for its trout, and welcomes fly anglers in their hundreds every year. In addition, tourists are also attracted by West Lothian's famous Standing Stones monuments, which surround Ballencrieff. The quarterly magazine Lothian Life - formerly known as 'West Lothian Life' - is produced at Ballencrieff Toll.

External links 

 Scottish Parliament website, Place-names document, page 14
 Streetmap.co.uk, Map of Ballencrieff
 A Vision of Britain Through Time, Ballencrieff
 VisitScotland.com, Ballencrieff Fishery
 Ballencrieff Fishery, official website
 The Megalithic Portal, Ballencrieff Standing Stones
 Lothian Life magazine
 West Lothian Life magazine, contact details

Populated places in West Lothian
Bathgate